Trachyphloeus is a genus of snout and bark beetles in the family Curculionidae. There are at least 80 described species in Trachyphloeus.

Species

References

Further reading

 
 
 
 
 
 
 
 
 

Polyphaga